The 1995 Centennial Cup was the 25th Junior "A" 1995 ice hockey National Championship for the Canadian Junior A Hockey League.

The Centennial Cup was competed for by the winners of the Doyle Cup, Anavet Cup, Dudley Hewitt Cup, the Fred Page Cup and the host city.

The tournament was hosted by the Gloucester Rangers in Gloucester, Ontario.

The playoffs

Round robin

Results
Gloucester Rangers defeat Joliette Nationals 7-0
Winnipeg South Blues defeat Thunder Bay Flyers 6-4
Calgary Canucks defeat Joliette Nationals 1-0 by rule challenge (Originally won by Joliette 5-1)
Gloucester Rangers defeat Winnipeg South Blues 6-2
Calgary Canucks defeat Thunder Bay Flyers 6-0
Calgary Canucks defeat Gloucester Rangers 5-4
Joliette Nationals defeat Winnipeg South Blues 5-3
Thunder Bay Flyers defeat Gloucester Rangers 5-2
Winnipeg South Blues defeat Calgary Canucks 6-3 for the Abbott Cup
Thunder Bay Flyers defeat Joliette Nationals 5-2

Semis and finals

Note: The final was won in overtime

Awards
Most Valuable Player: Mitch Grant (Winnipeg South Blues)
Top Scorer: Calvin Chartrand (Winnipeg South Blues)
Most Sportsmanlike Player: Curtis Bois (Thunder Bay Flyers)

All-Star Team
Forward
Curtis Bois (Thunder Bay Flyers)
Mitch Grant (Winnipeg South Blues)
Craig Fitzgerald (Gloucester Rangers)
Defence
Mitchell Ferguson (Calgary Canucks)
Luc Bilodeau (Joliette Nationals)
Goal
Brian Greer (Gloucester Rangers)

Roll of League Champions
AJHL: Calgary Canucks
BCHL: Chilliwack Chiefs
CJHL: Cornwall Colts
MJHL: Winnipeg South Blues
MJAHL: Moncton Beavers
MetJHL: Caledon Canadians
NOJHL: Timmins Golden Bears
OPJHL: Brampton Capitals
QPJHL: Joliette Nationals
RMJHL: Cranbrook Colts
SJHL: Weyburn Red Wings

See also
Canadian Junior A Hockey League
Royal Bank Cup
Anavet Cup
Doyle Cup
Dudley Hewitt Cup
Fred Page Cup
Abbott Cup
Mowat Cup

External links
Royal Bank Cup Website

1995
Cup